The Journal of Transformative Education is a peer-reviewed academic journal that publishes papers four times a year in the field of Education. The journal's editors are 
Chad Hoggan (North Carolina State University), Fergal Finnegan (National University of Ireland, Maynooth), and Kaisu Mälkki (University of Tampere). It has been in publication since 2003 and is currently published by SAGE Publications.

Scope 
The Journal of Transformative Education focuses on advancing the understanding, practice and experience of transformative education. The journal publishes articles that may test, build on and elaborate existing theoretical perspectives. The Journal of Transformative Education aims to explore the international and cross-cultural issues of the theory and practice of transformative learning.

Abstracting and indexing 
The Journal of Transformative Education is abstracted and indexed in the following databases:
 Business Source Complete
 Business Source Premier
 SCOPUS
 ZETOC

External links 
 

SAGE Publishing academic journals
English-language journals
Education journals